is a Japanese freestyle skier and . 

He competed in the 2018 Winter Olympics and won the bronze medal.

He became a professional racing cyclist (Keirin) on March 25, 2020. However, he has not retired from Freestyle skiing and competed in the 2022 Winter Olympics.

References

External links

RACERPROFILE(日本語) - Keirin(競輪)

1997 births
Living people
Sportspeople from Tokyo
Freestyle skiers at the 2018 Winter Olympics
Freestyle skiers at the 2022 Winter Olympics
Japanese male freestyle skiers
Nihon University alumni
Olympic freestyle skiers of Japan
Olympic bronze medalists for Japan
Olympic medalists in freestyle skiing
Medalists at the 2018 Winter Olympics
Asian Games medalists in freestyle skiing
Asian Games silver medalists for Japan
Freestyle skiers at the 2017 Asian Winter Games
Medalists at the 2017 Asian Winter Games
Universiade silver medalists for Japan
Universiade medalists in freestyle skiing
Competitors at the 2019 Winter Universiade
21st-century Japanese people